Judge Patterson may refer to:

Lester W. Patterson (1893–1947), county court judge from Bronx County New York
Robert P. Patterson (1891–1952), judge of the United States Court of Appeals for the Second Circuit
Robert P. Patterson Jr. (1923–2015), judge of the United States District Court for the Southern District of New York

See also
Justice Patterson (disambiguation)